Vanylven is a municipality in Møre og Romsdal county, Norway. It is part of the Sunnmøre region. The administrative centre is the village of Fiskåbygd. Other villages in the municipality include Åheim, Åram, Rovdane, Eidså, Slagnes, and Myklebost.

The  municipality is the 241st largest by area out of the 356 municipalities in Norway. Vanylven is the 225th most populous municipality in Norway with a population of 3,045.

General information

The parish of Vanelven was established as a municipality on 1 January 1838 (see formannskapsdistrikt law). The spelling was later changed to Vanylven. On 1 February 1918, the area around the Syvdsfjorden (population: 1,260) was separated to become the new Syvde Municipality. This left Vanylven with 1,848 residents.

During the 1960s, there were many municipal mergers across Norway due to the work of the Schei Committee. On 1 January 1964, Syvde Municipality (population: 1,458) and the Rovdestranda area (population: 436) of Rovde Municipality were both merged into Vanylven Municipality. This gave Vanylven a new population of 3,897.

On 1 January 2002, the mainland Åram area north of Fiskåbygd (population: 380) was transferred from Sande Municipality to Vanylven Municipality.

Name
The municipality is named after Vanylvsfjorden. The meaning of the first element is unknown, but the last element (-iflir) is also found in the names Sunnylven and Sykkylven and it probably means "fjord".

Before 1889, the name was written "Vanelven", from 1889 to 1917 it was spelled "Vannelven", and since 1918 it has been spelled "Vanylven".

Coat of arms
The coat of arms was granted on 11 December 1987. The arms are meant to show how the Vanylvsfjorden meets the sea, surrounded by the fertile green lands of Vanylven. The fertile lands and the sea which is full of herring are both important industries to the municipality.

Churches
The Church of Norway has four parishes within the municipality of Vanylven. It is part of the Søre Sunnmøre prosti (deanery) in the Diocese of Møre.

Geography

Vanylven borders the municipalities of Sande and Herøy in the north (across the Rovdefjorden). Volda Municipality lies to the east; and the municipality of Stad (in Vestland county) is located to the south.

Vanylven is located on the mainland of Norway and it is surrounded by several fjords. The Vanylvsfjorden lies to the west and the Rovdefjorden to the north. The Syvdsfjorden cuts into the municipality from the north and it empties into the Rovdefjorden. The Syltefjorden branches off the main Vanylvsfjorden, just past the village of Fiskåbygd.

Government
All municipalities in Norway, including Vanylven, are responsible for primary education (through 10th grade), outpatient health services, senior citizen services, unemployment and other social services, zoning, economic development, and municipal roads. The municipality is governed by a municipal council of elected representatives, which in turn elect a mayor.  The municipality falls under the Møre og Romsdal District Court and the Frostating Court of Appeal.

Municipal council
The municipal council of Vanylven is made up of 21 representatives that are elected to four year terms. The party breakdown of the council is as follows:

Mayor
The mayors of Vanylven (incomplete list):
2015–present: Lena M. Landsverk Sande (V)
2003-2015: Jan Helgøy (KrF)
1988-2003: Jon Aasen (Ap)
1984-1988: Jon Arne Lillebø (KrF)

Notable people 

 Jacob Vidnes (1875 in Vanylven – 1940) a trade unionist, newspaper editor and politician
 Marie Lovise Widnes (born 1930 in Vanylven) a poet, author, singer, composer and politician
 Helge Simonnes (born 1955 in Vanylven) editor, current editor-in-chief of Vårt Land
 Else Mundal (born 1944 in Vanylven) a Norwegian philologist and academic
 Maria Parr (born 1981 in Vanylven) a Norwegian children's writer

References

External links
Municipal fact sheet from Statistics Norway 
http://www.vanylven.kommune.no 

 
Sunnmøre
Municipalities of Møre og Romsdal
1838 establishments in Norway